The Yadegar-e-Imam Stadium was a multi-purpose stadium in Qom, Iran.  It is currently used mostly for football matches and is the home stadium of Saba Qom F.C. who currently play in Iran's Premier Football League. The stadium holds 10,610 people.

References

External links
Stadium information

Football venues in Iran
Multi-purpose stadiums in Iran
Buildings and structures in Qom
Sport in Qom